Clássico dos Clássicos is a derby between two crosstown football teams in the Brazilian city of Recife: Clube Náutico Capibaribe and Sport Club do Recife. It is the third oldest derby in Brazilian football (1909), just after Clássico dos Milhões and Grenal.

Background
Sport was created in 1905 by a falling out between Náutico members, renegade members leaving Náutico to create the new club.  The series of matches began in 1909.  A newspaper item in 1945 led to the current name for the derby.

The rivalry between the two clubs is intense and is reflected in part by the opposing teams' colors: the principal colors of Clube Náutico Capibaribe are red and white; those of Sport Club do Recife are red and black. The competitiveness has sometimes given rise to conflicts between the supporters of the teams, especially among organized members of the teams' fan clubs. Security has been a significant concern for the local authorities, involving large numbers of police and firefighters.

Statistics

Náutico has scored 644 and Sport has scored 704 goals.

Titles comparison

Highest attendance
1) Náutico 0 x 2 Sport, 80,203, March 15, 1998. Arruda Stadium.

References

External links
Official site
Official website

Brazilian football derbies